Quenton Harold Leach (20 August 1972 – 7 April 2020) was an Australian rules footballer who played in the Australian Football League (AFL) for the Fremantle Dockers between 1995 and 1998. He was drafted from Claremont in the West Australian Football League (WAFL) as a foundation selection in the 1994 AFL Draft and played mainly as a defender. He played for Marist Football Club in Churchlands in his junior career before being signed to Claremont.

Leach played most of his football in the backline, but is best remembered for kicking a goal after the siren to win a game against Brisbane in 1997.  Fremantle were behind by one point when Leach took a mark about 30 metres from goal, just seconds before the siren sounded to end the game.  His kick after the siren went straight through the goals and Fremantle won the game by 5 points.

In November 2016, Leach revealed that he had testicular cancer. In July 2017, it was reported that two rounds of chemotherapy had been successful in treating the cancer. However, in April 2020, Leach died from the cancer.

See also
After the siren kicks in Australian rules football

References

External links

1972 births
Fremantle Football Club players
Claremont Football Club players
2020 deaths
Deaths from testicular cancer
Australian rules footballers from Perth, Western Australia
People educated at Newman College, Perth
Subiaco Football Club players